Marla Rubin is an Olivier Award and South Bank Sky Arts Award-winning West End and Broadway theatre producer.

She is known for originating plays based on Scandinavian books and films, and has helped launch the careers of a number of high-profile actors, directors and writers, including Tom Hardy, Rory Kinnear, Rufus Norris, John Tiffany, and Jack Thorne.

Rubin began her career working in television documentaries. Her stage productions are recognised for their groundbreaking subject matter and for championing society's misfits and underdogs.

Education 

Marla Rubin is one of the historic first five women to ever graduate from Columbia University's undergraduate division, Columbia College. In 1985 she graduated magna cum laude and Phi Beta Kappa with a bachelor's degree in psychology and East Asian studies.  Rubin was awarded an international fellowship to study in Japan in 1986.  In 1999, she earned a master's degree from the University of Manchester and Sotheby's Institute of Art.

Rubin is a board member of the Danenberg Oberlin-in-London Program.

Productions 

[[Let the Right One In (novel)#Thorne|Let the Right One In]] - Adapted for the stage by Jack Thorne and directed by John Tiffany. The production received its world premiere at Dundee Repertory Theatre (2012), before transferring to the Royal Court Theatre, London (2013), the Apollo Theatre, West End (2014), and St. Ann's Warehouse, New York (2015). In addition to a US tour (2016), there have also been international productions of the play produced in Japan (2015), Finland (2015), Korea  (2016), Iceland (2016), Denmark (2016), Mexico  (2017), Australia (2017), Hungary (2017), Ireland (2018), Sweden (2019), Turkey (2019), Romania (2019) and El Salvador (2019). Upcoming productions of the show in 2021 include a return to Australia, Korea and the UK, as well as productions in Israel and South Africa.The Mountaintop - Written by Katori Hall and directed by James Dacre. The show received its world premiere at Theatre 503, London (2010), before transferring to Trafalgar Studios, West End (2010) starring David Harewood, and to the Bernard B. Jacobs Theatre, Broadway (2011), directed by Kenny Leon and starring Samuel L. Jackson and Angela Bassett. Subsequent productions have been produced throughout the United States and Canada (2012–present).Festen - Adapted for the stage by David Eldridge and directed by Rufus Norris. The production premiered at the Almeida Theatre, London (2004), before transferring to the Lyric Theatre, West End (2004), and the Music Box Theatre, Broadway (2006). The play has also been produced internationally at theatres including the Sydney Opera House (2005), the Arts Theatre, Melbourne (2006), Gate Theatre, Dublin (2006), Habima Theatre, Jerusalem (2008), as well as productions in South Africa (2007), Canada (2008), Cyprus (2009) and Turkey (2011), and a national tour of the United Kingdom (2007).

 Awards and nominations Let the Right One In2013 South Bank Sky Arts Awards, London: Winner Best New Play in UK (2013).
2015 Drama Desk Awards, New York: Nominee Outstanding Play: Jack Thorne, Outstanding Director: John Tiffany, Outstanding Set Design: Christine Jones, Outstanding Sound Design: Gareth Owen.The Mountaintop2011 Olivier Awards, London: Winner Best New Play (2011) and Nominee Best Actress: Lorraine Burroughs. 
2011 Evening Standard Awards, London: Nominee Most Promising Playwright: Katori Hall and Best Actor: David Harewood.Festen2004 Critics Circle Theatre Awards, London: Winner Best Director: Rufus Norris
2004 Evening Standard Awards, London: Winner Best Director: Rufus Norris and Best Set Design: Ian MacNeil
2005 WhatsOnStage Awards, London: Winner Best New Play
2005 Olivier Awards, London: Nominee Best New Play: David Eldridge, Best Director: Rufus Norris, Best Set Design: Ian MacNeil, Best Lighting Design: Jean Kalman, Best Sound Design: Paul Arditti
2005 Sydney Theatre Awards, Winner''' Best Director: Gayle Edwards and Best Set Design: Brian Thomson

References 

Canadian theatre managers and producers
Women theatre managers and producers
Year of birth missing (living people)
Living people
Columbia College (New York) alumni